The James Heyward Hull House is a historic home located at Shelby, Cleveland County, North Carolina.  It was built  1874 and extensively remodeled in 1907.  The remodeling added the Classical Revival style semi-elliptical monumental portico with fluted Corinthian order columns and pilasters. It is a two-story, square-in-plan main block with a central hall, triple pile floor plan and a hip roof.  A two-story rear wing was added in the 1940s.

It was listed on the National Register of Historic Places in 2003.

References

Houses on the National Register of Historic Places in North Carolina
Neoclassical architecture in North Carolina
Houses completed in 1907
Houses in Cleveland County, North Carolina
National Register of Historic Places in Cleveland County, North Carolina